The 1876 Mid Cheshire by-election was held on 18 July 1876.  The byelection was held due to the death of the incumbent Conservative MP, Egerton Leigh who had held the seat since his election in 1873.  The seat was won in 1876 by the Conservative candidate Piers Egerton-Warburton.  This election was uncontested.

References

1876 elections in the United Kingdom
1876 in England
19th century in Cheshire
By-elections to the Parliament of the United Kingdom in Cheshire constituencies
Unopposed by-elections to the Parliament of the United Kingdom in English constituencies
July 1876 events